A wallaroo is a medium-sized marsupial found in Australia. It can also be:

 Wallaroo, New South Wales a rural locality near Canberra in New South Wales in Australia
 Wallaroo, South Australia (disambiguation), articles associated with the town and locality
 Wallaroo, Western Australia a town in Australia
 The "Wallaroos", the Australia women's national rugby union team
 HMS Wallaroo (1890), a Pearl-class cruiser active off Australia before World War I
 HMAS Wallaroo, a Bathurst-class corvette sunk in a collision during World War II
 Wallaroo, a Sydney K-class ferry